Madeline Smith may refer to:

 Madeline Smith (born 1949), English actress
 Madeline "Maddy" Smith, fictional character in the British TV series, Wolfblood
 Madeleine Smith (1835–1928), socialite and alleged murderer
 Madelaine Smith (born 1995), skeleton racer
 Madolyn Smith (fl. 1980s–1990s), American actress